The 2019 Breeders' Cup Challenge series consisted of 86 horse races that provided the respective winners with an automatic "Win and You're In" Berth in the 2019 Breeders' Cup, held on November 1 and 2. Races were chosen by the Breeders' Cup organization and included key races in the various Breeders' Cup divisions from around the world. The Breeders' Cup organization paid the Breeders' Cup entry fee for the challenge race winners, provided they had been nominated as foals.

Summary
The 2019 Breeders' Cup Challenge series consisted of 86 races, 64 of which were Grade/Group One, from across 11 countries. There were 7 new races from the 2018 Series: the Gran Premio International Carlos Pellegrini (Turf), Prix Morny (Juvenile Turf Sprint), Fourstardave (Mile), Jockey Club Derby (Turf), the Kentucky Downs Turf Sprint (Turf Sprint), Cotillion (Distaff), Prix de l'Abbaye de Longchamp (Turf Sprint) and Prix de l'Arc de Triomphe (Turf). The following races were removed from the series: Doncaster Mile, Legacy Stakes, Gran Premio 25 de Mayo, Highlander, Forego, Spinaway, and Joe Hirsch Turf Classic. The International Stakes, formerly a qualifier for the Turf, became the first ever European qualifier for the Classic.

On October 21, fifty of the Challenge race winners were pre-entered in one or more of the Breeders' Cup races. Shortly before entries were taken, Magical – a leading contender in the Turf – was retired after spiking a fever.

Entries were taken on October 28. Several challenge race winners opted to enter a different division of the Breeders' Cup. For example, Omaha Beach, who qualified for the Sprint by winning the Santa Anita Sprint Championship, was instead entered in the Dirt Mile. Conversely, Catalina Cruiser and Mitole qualified for the Dirt Mile but instead were entered in the Sprint. Uni ran in the Mile instead of the Breeders' Cup Filly and Mare Turf. Elate was entered in the Classic after qualifying in the Distaff.

On Friday, two automatic qualifiers won their respective division of the Breeders' Cup. On Saturday, there were another three:
 Four Wheel Drive, who qualified by winning the Belmont Futurity, won the Juvenile Turf Sprint
 British Idiom, winner of the Alcibiades, also won the Juvenile Fillies
 Iridessa, who qualified by winning the Matron Stakes, won the Filly and Mare Turf
 Blue Prize won the Distaff after qualifying in the Spinster
 Bricks and Mortar qualified by winning the Arlington Million and then won the Turf

Mitole, who qualified for the Dirt Mile by winning the Metropolitan Handicap, won the Sprint. Uni won the Mile after qualifying in the First Lady Stakes for the Filly and Mare Turf.

Challenge Series races
The following table shows the Breeders' Cup Challenge races for 2019 and the respective winners. The status column shows whether the horse was subsequently entered in the corresponding Breeders' Cup race, and whether they finished in the money.

Television coverage
For the 2019 Breeders' Cup Challenge, NBCSN will produce 11 live broadcasts, covering more than 20 of the races in North America. The races will also be live streamed. This is in addition to NBC's coverage of the American Triple Crown series and Royal Ascot, the latter of which has four Breeders' Cup Challenge races.

See also

2019 British Champions Series

References

Breeders' Cup Challenge
Breeders' Cup Challenge series
Breeders' Cup
Breeders' Cup Challenge